Sybil Island is one of the many uninhabited Canadian arctic islands in Qikiqtaaluk Region, Nunavut. It is a Baffin Island offshore island located in Frobisher Bay, southeast of the capital city of Iqaluit. Other islands in the immediate vicinity include Crimmins Island, Jenvey Island, Kudlago Island, Pichit Island, and Sale Island.

References 

Islands of Baffin Island
Islands of Frobisher Bay
Uninhabited islands of Qikiqtaaluk Region